Imanuel Wanggai, also known as Manu, (born 23 February 1988) is an Indonesian former footballer who plays as a central midfielder. His cousins, Patrich Wanggai and Izaac Wanggai, are also a football players.

Career statistics

International

Honours

Club honors
Persipura Jayapura
Liga Indonesia (1): 2005
Indonesia Super League (3): 2008–09, 2010–11, 2013
Indonesian Inter Island Cup (1): 2011
 Indonesia Soccer Championship A: 2016

References

External links

1988 births
Living people
Papuan people
People from Jayapura
Indonesian footballers
Indonesian men's futsal players
Indonesia international footballers
Indonesia youth international footballers
Association football midfielders
Indonesian Christians
Indonesian Super League-winning players
Liga 1 (Indonesia) players
Persipura Jayapura players
Indonesian expatriate sportspeople in East Timor
Expatriate footballers in East Timor
Indonesian expatriate footballers
Sportspeople from Papua